Abdol Deh (also Romanized as ‘Abdol Deh; also known as ‘Abdollāhābād, ‘Abdullāhābād, ‘Andal Deh, and Chalusān) is a village in Natel-e Restaq Rural District, Chamestan District, Nur County, Mazandaran Province, Iran. At the 2006 census, its population was 464, in 113 families.

References 

Populated places in Nur County